Douglas Brian Keola Moylan (born October 19, 1966) is a Guamanian politician and attorney under the Law Office. He was the first elected and youngest Attorney General of Guam serving from 2003 to 2007.

He was licensed in California in 1990 and has been in active practice for 28 years. In 2022, Moylan ran again to be Guam's next Attorney General in the 2022 election. He defeated the incumbent Leevin Camacho.

Biography
He was born on October 19, 1966 in Stockton, California to his parents Richard and Jane Moylan and has four brothers Jeffrey, Scott, Brian and Steven. Moylan is the grandson of the late Scotty Moylan, a former businessman and Patriarch. His cousins are former lieutenant governor is Kaleo Moylan and Kamaka Moylan Alston a realtor. Moylan is an attorney licensed to practice law in California, Guam and Washington D.C. He served as the Legislative Counsel to the 24th, 25th and 26th Guam Legislatures before becoming Guam's first elected Attorney General in January 2003, for a 4-year term. He also served several terms as a Guam Election Commission board member, appointed by Guam's Republican Party to hold 1 of 3 Republican slots.

While he was Attorney General, in 2003 the Government of Guam attempted to borrow over $350 million which Moylan considered a violation of the debt limitation provisions of the Guam Organic Act of 1950. The Supreme Court of Guam was asked to decide the issue by Governor Felix Perez Camacho. When the Guam Supreme Court's rejected Moylan's legal position, he appealed their decision to the Ninth Circuit Court of Appeals under the Ninth Circuit's discretionary review authority. The Ninth Circuit granted Moylan's writ of certiorari request. After oral argument, a change in federal law deprived the Ninth Circuit of jurisdiction. Moylan then filed a writ of certiorari in the U.S. Supreme Court, which agreed to hear his appeal in 2006. The U.S. Supreme Court reversed the Supreme Court of Guam and ruled in Moylan's favor in 2007 in Limtiaco v. Camacho, after his term expired in December 2006.

Moylan ran for senator with the Republican party in 2008 and 2010 elections.

Moylan ran for re-election as Guam's next Attorney General in the 2018 election. The other candidate was Leevin Camacho.

Education
Douglas B. Moylan graduated from the University of Notre Dame in 1988 with Bachelors in Business Administration & Sociology degrees.  He earned his JD from Santa Clara University School of Law in 1991.

References

External links
Official bio
NAAG bio

|-

1966 births
American lawyers
Attorneys General of Guam
Living people
Guamanian lawyers
Guamanian Republicans
Guamanian people of Chinese descent
Guamanian people of Irish descent
Guamanian people of Native Hawaiian descent
Guamanian people of Polish descent
Santa Clara University School of Law alumni
University of Notre Dame alumni
Politicians from Stockton, California